Hiranpur is a village in the Hiranpur CD block in the Pakur subdivision of the Pakur district in the Indian state of Jharkhand.

Geography

Location

Overview
Rajmahal coalfield is shown in the map. The entire area is overwhelmingly rural with only small pockets of urbanisation.

Note: The full screen map is interesting. All places marked on the map are linked and you can easily move on to another page of your choice. Enlarge the map to see what else is there – one gets railway links, many more road links and so on.

Demographics
According to the 2011 Census of India, Hiranpur (Khas) had a total population of 1,135, of which 564 (50%) were males and 571 (50%) were females. Population in the age range 0–6 years was 226. The total number of literate persons in Hiranpur was 582 (64.03% of the population over 6 years).

Civic administration

Police station
Hiranpur police station serves Hiranpur CD block.

CD block HQ
Headquarters of Hiranpur CD block is at Hiranpur village.

Education
Rajkiyakrit High School Hiranpur is a Hindi-medium coeducational institution established in 1950. It has facilities for teaching from class IX to class XII.

References

Villages in Pakur district